Maciej Świdzikowski (born 9 September 1989) is a Polish professional footballer who plays as a defender for Weszło Warsaw, on loan from Radomiak Radom.

Career

He started his career with Radomiak Radom.

On 11 July 2022, he left Radomiak for the first time in thirteen years to join V liga side Weszło Warsaw on a one-year loan spell.

Honours

Club
Radomiak Radom
I liga: 2020–21
II liga: 2018–19

References

External links

1989 births
Living people
Association football defenders
Polish footballers
Legia Warsaw players
Radomiak Radom players
KTS Weszło Warsaw players
Ekstraklasa players
I liga players
II liga players
People from Radom